Caltignaga is a comune (municipality) in the Province of Novara in the Italian region Piedmont, located about  northeast of Turin and about  northwest of Novara.

Caltignaga borders the following municipalities: Bellinzago Novarese, Briona, Cameri, Momo, Novara, and San Pietro Mosezzo.

Main sights
Parish church of Santa Maria Assunta (11th-12th centuries)
Castle (14th-17th centuries)
Oratory of Santi Nazzaro e Celso, in the frazione of Sologno (11th century). It is an example of Romanesque architecture housing, in the interior, mid-15th centuries frescoes by Giovanni da Campo and others. They depict stories of the legendary lives of Nazarius and Celsus.
Remains of a Roman aqueduct

References

External links
 Official website

Cities and towns in Piedmont